The mixed doubles table tennis event was part of the table tennis programme at the 2020 Summer Olympics in Tokyo. The event took place from 24 July to 26 July 2021 at Tokyo Metropolitan Gymnasium. This was the first time ever mixed doubles event contested in the Summer Olympics. Jun Mizutani and Mima Ito won Japan's first-ever table tennis Olympic gold medal.

The medals for the competition were presented by Li Lingwei, IOC Member, China; and the medalists' bouquets were presented by Raul Calin, ITTF Secretary General; Spain.

Qualification

Schedule

Seeds 
The seeds were revealed on 18 July 2021. The results of the draw are announced on 21 July at the Tokyo Metropolitan Gymnasium.

 (final, silver medalists)
 (champions, gold medalists)
 (semifinals, bronze medalists)
 (quarterfinals)
 (first round)
 (quarterfinals)
 (quarterfinals)
 (semifinals, fourth place)
 (quarterfinals)
 (first round)
 (first round)
 (first round)
 (first round)
 (first round)
 (first round)
 (first round)

Draw

References

External links 
 Results Books : Tokyo 2020. The Tokyo Organising Committee of the Olympic and Paralympic Games. (2021).
 2020 Summer Olympics / Table Tennis / Doubles, Mixed. Olympedia.org

Mixed doubles
Mixed events at the 2020 Summer Olympics
Mixed doubles table tennis